
The Charing Cross and Waterloo Electric Railway (CC&WER) was a railway company established in 1881 to construct an underground railway in London. The CC&WER proposed a line between a station under Trafalgar Square and the London and South Western Railway's terminus at Waterloo. The plan was similar in concept to that proposed by the Waterloo and Whitehall Railway in 1864 which could not raise funds due to a banking crisis. To form the tunnels under the River Thames, iron pipes would be sunk into a trench dredged in the river bed.

The CC&WER was the first to propose electric traction for its trains and was supported by Sir William Siemens. His brother, Werner von Siemens, had demonstrated the first electric railway in Berlin in 1879 and their electrical engineering company Siemens Brothers was to provide the electrical equipment and operate the line for the first five years.

Permission to construct the line was granted by parliament on 18 August 1882 and a proposal was submitted in December 1882 to continue the line from Waterloo to Blackfriars and the Royal Exchange in the City of London. The extension was opposed by the Metropolitan Board of Works, but difficulties in raising funds to construct the line due to the novelty of its method of traction, led to the extension bill being withdrawn in May 1883. William Siemens died in November 1883 and the company was abandoned in July 1885.

Notes and references

Notes

References

Bibliography

 

Transport in the London Borough of Lambeth
Transport in the City of Westminster
Tunnels underneath the River Thames
Abandoned underground railway projects in London
Railway companies established in 1881
Railway companies disestablished in 1885
British companies disestablished in 1885
British companies established in 1881